Cats on the Coast was the second album by American rock band Sea Level. It was released in 1977 on Capricorn Records.

The leadoff track, "That's Your Secret",  reached #50 on the Billboard Hot 100, the band's only charting single.

Reception

In a review for AllMusic, Dave Lynch wrote: "Some great music from Sea Level was still to come, but the best moments of Cats on the Coast wouldn't be topped."

Exposé's Peter Thelen stated that, with the album, "there... seemed to be a new emphasis on the vocal material, which seemed to be changing from a country funk sound into more of a funky white soul a la Boz Scaggs. Only four instrumentals this time out, one under two minutes, but still the high point of the album, especially the title track."

Track listing

Side one
 "That's Your Secret" (Randall Bramblett, Davis Causey) – 5:15
 "It Hurts to Want It So Bad" (Charles Feldman, Tim Smith, Steve Smith) – 3:38
 "Storm Warning" (Chuck Leavell) – 5:23
 "Had to Fall" (Randall Bramblett, Jimmy Nalls, Lamar Williams) – 4:35

Side two
 "Midnight Pass" (Neil Larsen) – 6:30
 "Every Little Thing" (Randall Bramblett) – 4:40
 "Cats on the Coast" (Davis Causey) – 5:38
 "Song for Amy" (Chuck Leavell) – 1:40

Charts

Personnel 
 Randall Bramblett – organ, alto saxophone, soprano saxophone, vocals, percussion
 Davis Causey – guitar, backing vocals
 Jai Johanny Johanson – congas
 Chuck Leavell – piano, organ, electric piano, ARP Odyssey, clavinet, percussion, vocals
 Jimmy Nalls – guitar, backing vocals
 George Weaver – drums
 Lamar Williams – bass
Technical
 Stewart Levine – producer
 Rik Pekkonen – engineer
 David Pinkston – engineer

References

1977 albums
Capricorn Records albums
Albums produced by Stewart Levine